Friedensfeld may refer to:

Friedensfeld, Manitoba, a settlement in Canada
Friedensfeld West, Manitoba, a settlement in Canada 
Friedensfeld, United States Virgin Islands, a settlement on the island of Saint Croix